Zayse-Zergulla is the combined title for the two closely related dialects of Zayse (also Zaysete, Zaisse, Zaysite, Zaysse) and Zergulla (or Zergula). The division may be more along ethnic or geographic lines than linguistic. It is an Afro-Asiatic Omotic language, and is spoken in the southwestern part of Ethiopia, to the immediate west of Lake Chamo. It is similar to the Gidicho dialect of the Koorete language.

Notes

Bibliography
Hayward, Richard J. 1990. "Notes on the Zayse Language" in Omotic Language Studies. London: School of Oriental and African Studies, University of London. pp. 210–355.

External links
 World Atlas of Language Structures information on Zayse

Languages of Ethiopia
North Omotic languages